Dexter Jerome Pittman (born March 2, 1988) is an American professional basketball player for Al-Qurain SC of the Kuwaiti Division I Basketball League. He played college basketball for the University of Texas.

High school career
Pittman was a three-year starter at B. F. Terry High School, where he averaged 15 points and 8.5 rebounds per game over his career.  In his senior season, he was named the Most Valuable Player for District 24-4A.

Considered a three-star recruit by Rivals.com, Pittman was listed as the No. 16 center and the No. 150 player in the nation in 2006.

College career
Pittman was used sparingly in his first two seasons at Texas, averaging less than 3 points per game with just one start. As a junior, he started 24 games–averaging 10 points and 5.5 rebounds per game–and became one of the most dominant centers in the Big 12 conference.

Weight loss
Pittman weighed 388 lbs  as a senior at Terry High School. After receiving weight loss tips from Texas' Strength and Conditioning coach Todd Wright, he was able to drop his weight to 366 lbs before enrolling at Texas. His weight still prevented him from doing basic drills in practice, which caused various back and knee aches. Pittman then dedicated himself to a workout program with Wright, which included 5:30 AM workouts and a complete revamp of his diet. Pittman agreed to call Todd Wright before every meal to evaluate his choices. He later characterized the workout regimen as so tough that "I wanted to cry and say, 'Man, I want to give up'". Since losing almost 100 pounds, he has become an icon for admirers, like Hall of Famer Charles Barkley, who heard about his weight loss.

College statistics

|-
| align="left" | 2006–07
| align="left" | Texas Longhorns
| 29 || 0 || 5.3 || .604 || .000 || .471 || 1.8 || .1 || .2 || .3 || 2.6
|-
| align="left" | 2007–08
| style="text-align:left;"| Texas Longhorns
| 36 || 1 || 6.8 || .559 || .000 || .561 || 2.4 || .2 || .1 || .5 || 2.8
|-
| align="left" | 2008–09
| align="left" | Texas Longhorns
| 35 || 24 || 16.6 || .616 || .000 || .691 || 5.5 || .4 || .4 || .9 || 10.1
|-
| align="left" | 2009–10
| align="left" | Texas Longhorns
| 34 || 34 || 19.1 || .654 || .000 || .556 || 5.9 || .5 || .4 || 1.9 || 10.4
|-
| align="left" | Career
| align="left" |
| 134 || 59 || 12.2 || .623 || .000 || .601 || 3.9 || .3 || .2 || .9 || 6.6

Professional career
Pittman was selected with the 32nd overall pick in the 2010 NBA draft by the Miami Heat. On July 16, 2010, he signed a multi-year deal with the Heat. On November 26, 2010, Pittman was assigned to the Sioux Falls Skyforce. On December 18, 2010, he was recalled by the Heat. On January 6, 2011, he was reassigned to the Skyforce. He was later selected to the 2011 NBA D-League All-Star game. Pittman made his NBA debut on April 1, 2011, against the Minnesota Timberwolves. The Heat made it to the 2011 NBA Finals but lost to the Dallas Mavericks in six games.

On April 13, 2012, Pittman scored a career high 16 points in a 105–82 win against the Charlotte Bobcats. In Game 5 of the 2012 Conference semi-finals against the Indiana Pacers, Pittman was assessed a flagrant foul after he came across the lane and used his forearm to hit Lance Stephenson of the Pacers with 19.4 seconds left in the game. Pittman was later suspended for three games due to the incident. The Heat advanced to the 2012 NBA Finals and won the series against Oklahoma City Thunder in five games, giving Pittman his first championship.

During the 2012–13 season, Pittman was assigned multiple times to the Skyforce.

On February 21, 2013, the Heat traded Pittman and a second round pick to the Memphis Grizzlies for a trade exception and the rights to Ricky Sanchez. On April 14, 2013, he was waived by the Grizzlies.

Pittman joined the San Antonio Spurs for the 2013 NBA Summer League. In September 2013, he signed with the Chicago Bulls. However, he was later waived by the Bulls on October 26, 2013.

On November 27, 2013, Pittman was acquired by the Springfield Armor. However, his contract was bought out by the Armor on December 3, before he appeared in a game for them. He subsequently signed with the Foshan Long Lions of China as an injury-replacement for Shavlik Randolph. Later that month, he left Foshan after seven games.

On January 6, 2014, Pittman was acquired by the Austin Toros.

On February 22, 2014, Pittman signed a 10-day contract with the Atlanta Hawks. Pittman's final NBA game was on February 26, 2014, in a 104–115 loss to the Boston Celtics. In that game, Pittman only played 30 seconds and didn't record a single statistic. On February 27, 2014, he was waived by the Hawks. On March 2, 2014, he was reacquired by the Toros. On April 10, 2014, he signed with the Houston Rockets. A few days later, he was released by the Rockets before appearing in a game for them.

On April 19, 2014, Pittman signed with Caciques de Humacao for the 2014 BSN season.

On September 29, 2014, Pittman signed with the Atlanta Hawks. However, he was later waived by the Hawks on October 21, 2014. On November 27, 2014, he signed with TED Ankara of Turkey for the rest of the 2014–15 season.

On June 26, 2015, he signed with Virtus Bologna of the Italian Lega Basket Serie A for the 2015–16 season.

On May 12, 2016, Pittman was acquired by Santeros de Aguada of the Puerto Rican League.

On December 16, 2016, Pittman signed with Toyama Grouses of the Japanese B.League. During the 2017-18 season he posted 11.5 points and 6 rebounds per game. He signed with B.League team Rizing Zephyr Fukuoka on September 20, 2018.

On October 9, 2021, Pittman signed with Al Sharjah of the UAE National Basketball League.

Career statistics

NBA

Regular season

|-
| align="left" | 
| align="left" | Miami
| 2 || 0 || 5.5 || .333 || .000 || .000 || 1.5 || .0 || .0 || .0 || 1.0
|-
| align="left" style="background:#afe6ba;" | †
| align="left" | Miami
| 35 || 6 || 8.6 || .468 || .000 || .643 || 2.0 || .3 || .2 || .2 || 3.0
|-
| align="left" | 
| align="left" | Miami
| 4 || 0 || 3.0 || .600 || .000 || .000 || 1.8 || .0 || .0 || .0 || 1.5
|-
| align="left" | 
| align="left" | Memphis
| 7 || 0 || 2.9 || .167 || .000 || .000 || .7 || .0 || .0 || .0 || .3
|-
| align="left" | 
| align="left" | Atlanta
| 2 || 0 || 1.5 || .000 || .000 || .000 || 1.5 || .0 || .0 || .0 || .0
|-
|- class="sortbottom"
| style="text-align:center;" colspan="2"| Career
| 50 || 6 || 6.9 || .450 || .000 || .545 || 1.8 || .2 || .2 || .2 || 2.3

Playoffs

|-
| align="left" style="background:#afe6ba;" | 2012†
| align="left" | Miami
| 3 || 1 || 2.7 || .000 || .000 || .000 || .0 || .3 || .0 || .3 || .0
|-
|- class="sortbottom"
| style="text-align:center;" colspan="2"| Career
| 3 || 1 || 2.7 || .000 || .000 || .000 || .0 || .3 || .0 || .3 || .0

NBA D-League

Regular season

|-
| align="left" | 2010–11
| align="left" | Sioux Falls
| 22 || 22 || 27.7 || .536 || .000 || .548 || 8.2 || 1.2 || .4 || 1.7 || 14.5
|-
| align="left" | 2012–13
| align="left" | Sioux Falls
| 15 || 12 || 24.9 || .470 || .000 || .767 || 8.8 || .3 || .9 || 1.7 || 12.4
|-
| align="left" | 2013–14
| align="left" | Austin
| 28 || 20 || 20.5 || .556 || .000 || .705 || 6.8 || .5 || .5 || 2.3 || 11.3
|-
|- class="sortbottom"
| style="text-align:center;" colspan="2"| Career
| 65 || 54 || 24.0 || .527 || .000 || .652 || 7.7 || .7 || .6 || 1.9 || 12.6

CBA

Regular season

|-
| align="left" | 2013–14
| align="left" | Foshan
| 7 || 0 || 18.7 || .649 || .000 || .441 || 5.5|| .4 || .3 || 1.0 || 15.0
|-
|- class="sortbottom"
| style="text-align:center;" colspan="2"| Career
| 7 || 0 || 18.7 || .649 || .000 || .441 || 5.5 || .4 || .3 || 1.0 || 15.0

B.League

Regular season

|-
| align="left" | 2016-17
| align="left" | Toyama
| 35 || 19 || 19.9 || .538 || .000 || .600 || 7.8 ||.4  || .3 || 1.1 || 12.9
|-
| align="left" | 2017-18
| align="left" | Toyama
| 57 || 13 || 17.8 || .585 || .000 || .608 || 5.9 ||1.4  || .5 || .6 || 11.5
|-

References

External links

1988 births
Living people
American expatriate basketball people in China
American expatriate basketball people in Italy
American expatriate basketball people in Japan
American expatriate basketball people in Turkey
American men's basketball players
Atlanta Hawks players
Austin Toros players
Basketball players from Texas
Caciques de Humacao players
Centers (basketball)
Guangzhou Loong Lions players
Memphis Grizzlies players
Miami Heat draft picks
Miami Heat players
People from Rosenberg, Texas
Rizing Zephyr Fukuoka players
Santeros de Aguada basketball players
Sioux Falls Skyforce players
Sportspeople from the Houston metropolitan area
TED Ankara Kolejliler players
Texas Longhorns men's basketball players
Toyama Grouses players
Virtus Bologna players